Kraskovo is an urban locality (a suburban (dacha) settlement) in Lyuberetsky District of Moscow Oblast, Russia. Dialing code: +7 495 (formerly +7 095).

History

The first written references to Kraskovo date back to 1623. In 1861—1917 it was a part of the Vykhino Volost of the Moskovsky Uyezd of the Moscow Governorate. It is located on the Pekhorka River.

It was heavily damaged after the October Revolution of 1917—the park was deforested and most of its area was used for construction.  The main house with its auxiliary wings and a church, household courtyard, and a crude kerb-stone fence still remain.

Another historic site of Kraskovo is the brick empire Vladimir church, constructed in 1831–1832.

In 1898, the first hospital opened, which is known today as Lyuberetsky District Hospital #1.  There are also children and adult clinics and a veterinarian for domestic animals.

Facilities
Children pre-schools and schools of general education, children intellectual development center, a stadium and a sporting school. State professional vocational training lyceum and Moscow artistic teacher's training college of technology and design.

Government
The former Heads of the Local Government Board are Iskander Izmaylovich Badayev and Sergey Petrovich Bykov. On September 28, 2008 Sergey Bykov was removed from the candidate list for the October 12 elections by the court decision.

References

Notes

Sources

Urban-type settlements in Moscow Oblast